The Volleyball Thailand League is the highest level of Thailand club volleyball in the 2012–13 season and the 8th edition.

Ranking 

|}

Round 1-2 

|}

Final standing

Awards

References

External links
 

Volleyball,Men's Thailand League
Volleyball,Men's Thailand League
2012